Henry Augustus Lyons (October 5, 1809 – July 27, 1872) was the second Chief Justice of California, appointed to the court by the California State Legislature at the formation of the state. He was the first Jewish justice on the court.

Background 
Lyons was one of five sons and a daughter born to Solomon and Sarah (also known as Rebecca) Lyons in Philadelphia, Pennsylvania. Around 1834, Lyons's older brother Zaligman Selwin became an attorney and moved to Jackson, Louisiana. Lyons then followed and settled in St. Francisville. In May 1846, Governor Isaac Johnson appointed Lyons as an aide-de-camp to the commander-in-chief of the Louisiana militia during the Mexican–American War. In April 1849, Lyons lost a lawsuit over a promissory note for $2,200 he signed in April 1843 in West Feliciana Parish, Louisiana.

Lyons married Eliza Pirrie in 1840. Pirrie was already twice a widow and had a boy, Robert Hillard Jr, from her first husband Robert Hillard, and two children (Isabelle and James Pirrie Bowman) with her second husband William Robert Bowman. Together with Lyons, they had three daughters and a son: Lucy Pirrie, Cora August and Eliza (who passed in childhood in 1853), and Henry A. Lyons, Jr. In 1851, Lyons's wife passed at the age of 46. On February 27, 1891, his daughter, Cora, died in San Rafael, California, at the age of 46, the same age as her mother.

Career in California 
Lyons left his family to travel to California during the Gold Rush, ultimately settling in the Sonora area. In 1849, he ran for State Senate. In 1849, he sought a seat on the newly formed state Supreme Court. An experienced attorney, he came in second for the votes by the state Senate for the California Supreme Court (behind Justice Serranus Clinton Hastings). Hastings had a two-year term ending in 1852, and Lyons then took over as chief justice. Lyons resigned as Chief on March 31, 1852, after serving only three months. Lyons wrote a total of eleven opinions during his term on the Court: nine as an associate justice and two as Chief.

After his term, Lyons remained active in politics but did not return to practicing law. Instead, he focused on his business interests in San Francisco and mining ventures. In June 1852, Lyons served as a delegate from California to the Democratic National Convention held in Baltimore, Maryland.

Lyons died on July 27, 1872 in San Francisco.

See also
 Hugh Murray
 List of justices of the Supreme Court of California
 Nathaniel Bennett
 S. Clinton Hastings

References

External links
 
 Past & Present Justices. California State Courts. Retrieved July 19, 2017.

1809 births
1872 deaths
Chief Justices of California
Justices of the Supreme Court of California
19th-century American judges
U.S. state supreme court judges admitted to the practice of law by reading law
People from Philadelphia
People from St. Francisville, Louisiana
People of the California Gold Rush
Jewish American attorneys
Lawyers from San Francisco
American military personnel of the Mexican–American War
19th-century American Jews
19th-century American lawyers